Mortimer Wardle Byers (March 28, 1877 – March 5, 1962) was a United States district judge of the United States District Court for the Eastern District of New York from 1929 to 1962 and its Chief Judge from 1958 to 1959.

Education and career

Born in Brooklyn, New York, Byers received a Bachelor of Laws from Columbia Law School in 1898, and then served as a sergeant in the 23rd Regiment of the New York State National Guard in World War I. He was in private practice of law in Brooklyn from 1898 to 1929.

Federal judicial service

Byers was nominated by President Herbert Hoover on September 9, 1929, to the United States District Court for the Eastern District of New York, to a new seat authorized by 45 Stat. 1409. He was confirmed by the United States Senate on November 20, 1929, and received his commission the same day. He served as Chief Judge from 1958 to 1959. He assumed senior status on February 1, 1960. His service terminated on March 5, 1962, due to his death in Brooklyn.

Notable case

In 1957, Byers presided over the trial of Soviet spy Vilyam Genrikhovich Fisher (better known by his alias, Rudolf Abel) in what was known as the Hollow Nickel Case. Fisher was convicted on three counts, and on November 15, 1957, Byers sentenced Fisher to concurrent terms of imprisonment of thirty, ten and five years on the three counts and fined him a total of three thousand dollars.

Portrayal

Byers was portrayed by Dakin Matthews in Steven Spielberg's Bridge of Spies.

References

Sources
 

Judges of the United States District Court for the Eastern District of New York
United States district court judges appointed by Herbert Hoover
20th-century American judges
1877 births
1962 deaths
Columbia Law School alumni
People from Brooklyn